Valentine is the second studio album by American indie rock musician Snail Mail, released on November 5, 2021, by Matador Records.

Background
Lindsey Jordan, known as Snail Mail, tried to begin writing material for her second studio album immediately after her debut, Lush (2018). However, she struggled to write because she was on tour and lacked opportunities for solitude. During the beginning of the COVID-19 pandemic, Jordan returned to her parents' home in Baltimore, where she began to start working seriously on Valentine. In November 2020, Jordan spent 45 days in a rehab facility in Arizona, an experience she references directly in "Ben Franklin".

According to Snail Mail's Twitter, Jordan stated: "Making this album has been the greatest challenge of my life thus far. I put my entire heart and soul into every last detail. Thank you for sticking with me and trusting me, as I turn the page into the new chapter of The Book of Snail Mail."

Critical reception

Valentine received critical acclaim upon release, earning a Metacritic score of 88/100 and the 'Best New Music' certification by Pitchfork. Olivia Horn of Pitchfork wrote that Jordan "flirts with pop—sharpening her hooks, reaching for the synths and strings", in contrast to the "limited possibilities of a three-piece rock band" on her previous album Lush. Horn rated the album 8.5/10, stating that Jordan's songwriting was "dazzlingly sharp and passionate". In a review for NME, El Hunt wrote that "Jordan's songwriting is as astute as ever, and her exploration of love here is set to a rich palette of explorative strings and synths", rating the album 5 stars out of 5. Writing for AllMusic, Marcy Donelson gave the album 3.5 starts out of 5, arguing that while Valentine represents a "bold musical step" for Jordan, it nevertheless "leaves some of her distinctiveness behind." Writing for Slant, John Amen also rated the album 3.5/5, concluding that "If Lush presented a snapshot of a particular mindset, a woman trapped in a psychological limbo, Valentine captures the blurry nature of an inquiry still in progress."

Accolades

Track listing
All tracks written by Lindsey Jordan.

Personnel
Credits are adapted from the Valentine liner notes.

Musicians
 Lindsey Jordan — vocals; keyboards
 Alex Bass — bass
 Ray Brown — drums
 Alex Farrar — keyboards
 Katie Crutchfield — backing vocals on "Ben Franklin"
 Kaitlin Grady — cello on "Light Blue" and "Glory"
 Stephanie Barrett — cello on "Mia"
 Jocelyn Smith — viola on "Mia"
 Kim Ryan — viola on "Mia"
 Liz Stahr — viola on "Mia"
 Adrian Pintea — violin on "Mia"
 Anna Bishop — violin on "Mia"
 Ellen Riccio — violin on "Mia"
 Jeannette Jang — violin on "Mia"
 Meredith Riley — violin on "Mia"
 Treesa Gold — violin on "Mia"

Production and artwork
 Brad Cook – producer
 Lindsey Jordan — producer
 Alex Farrar — engineer; mixer
 Tina Tyrell — photography
 Alexa Lanza — styling

Charts

References

External links
 

2021 albums
Snail Mail (musician) albums
Matador Records albums
Indie rock albums